Ophthalmoparesis  refers to weakness (-paresis) or paralysis (-plegia) of one or more extraocular muscles which are responsible for eye movements. It is a physical finding in certain neurologic, ophthalmologic, and endocrine disease.

Internal ophthalmoplegia means involvement limited to the pupillary sphincter and ciliary muscle. External ophthalmoplegia refers to involvement of only the extraocular muscles. Complete ophthalmoplegia indicates involvement of both.

Causes
Ophthalmoparesis can result from disorders of various parts of the eye and nervous system:
 Infection around the eye. Ophthalmoplegia is an important finding in orbital cellulitis.
 The orbit of the eye, including mechanical restrictions of eye movement, as in Graves' disease.
 The muscle, as in progressive external ophthalmoplegia or Kearns–Sayre syndrome.
 The neuromuscular junction, as in myasthenia gravis.
 The relevant cranial nerves (specifically the oculomotor, trochlear, and abducens), as in cavernous sinus syndrome or raised intracranial pressure.
 The brainstem nuclei of these nerves, as in certain patterns of brainstem stroke such as Foville's syndrome.
 White matter tracts connecting these nuclei, as in internuclear ophthalmoplegia, an occasional finding in multiple sclerosis.
 Dorsal midbrain structures, as in Parinaud's syndrome.
 Certain parts of the cerebral cortex (including the frontal eye fields), as in stroke.
 Toxic envenomation by mambas, taipans, and kraits.

Thiamine deficiency can cause ophthalmoparesis in susceptible persons; this is part of the syndrome called Wernicke encephalopathy.  The causal pathway by which this occurs is unknown.  Intoxication with certain substances, such as phenytoin, can also cause ophthalmoparesis.

Diagnosis

Classification
Ophthalmoparesis can involve any or all of the extraocular muscles, which include the superior recti, inferior recti, medial recti, lateral recti, inferior oblique and superior oblique muscles.

It can also be classified by the directions of affected movements, e.g. "vertical ophthalmoparesis".

Treatment
Treatment and prognosis depend on the underlying condition.  For example, in thiamine deficiency, treatment would be the immediate administration of vitamin B1.

See also
 Paresis

References

External links 

Disorders of ocular muscles, binocular movement, accommodation and refraction